Black Rooster EP is the debut EP by indie rock band The Kills.

Background
In 2001, the Kills showcased new songs on a demo tape; however, the pair shunned approaches from major record labels. Recording as VV and Hotel, they contributed the song "Restaurant Blouse" to the compilation If the Twenty-First Century Did Not Exist, It Would Be Necessary to Invent It. Shortly after this, they signed to Domino Records and recorded their debut release, the Black Rooster EP in Toe Rag Studios in March 2002; it was all recorded on 8-track by Liam Watson except "Dropout Boogie" which is live at Paint It Black, 4 April 2002 and "Gum", recorded on a Dictaphone by the band. The record sleeve featured photos of Mosshart and Hince taken in a photo booth rather than professional photography.

The record was lo-fi in both musical and aesthetic terms. Musically, the record was a sparse, lo-fi garage rock/blues hybrid though the band cites Captain Beefheart, PJ Harvey, LCD Soundsystem, The Velvet Underground, The Fall, Patti Smith, Suicide and Royal Trux as immediate influences; the music press has largely compared them to The White Stripes.

Track listing

Personnel

The Kills
Alison "VV" Mosshart – vocals, guitar on "Wait"
Jamie "Hotel" Hince – guitar, drums, tambourine, vocals

References

2002 debut EPs
The Kills albums
Domino Recording Company EPs